Antipsara is a small Greek island in the Aegean Sea. Antipsara had 4 inhabitants according to the 2011 census. Geographic conditions make it inaccessible from the north and west side. Evidence exists of settlement in ancient Greek and Roman times. During Ottoman rule the island served as a port. Nowadays, tourist trips to the island originate from Psara in the summer months. The small church of St John (Άγιος Ιωάννης) on the eastern side is visited in August by pilgrims.

Wildlife
The island is a nesting site of the European shag (Phalacrocorax aristotelis), Eleonora's falcon (Falco eleonorae), Cory's shearwater (Calonectris diomedea), and the yelkouan shearwater (Puffinus yelkouan).

Gallery

References

Islands of Greece
Psara
Landforms of Chios (regional unit)
Islands of the North Aegean